Farende folk (Traveling Folk) is a Norwegian silent film from 1922, directed by Amund Rydland. The screenplay was written by Rydland and the actor Martin Gisti, and it is based on Severin Lieblein's 1910 novel .

The film is available for free at the website of the National Library of Norway.

Cast
 Amund Rydland as Ahti 
 Arna Fahlstrøm as Ahti's girlfriend
 Lars Tvinde as Klemet the Gypsy chief 
 Martin Gisti as Mjøltraavaren
 Agnes Mowinckel as Birgitte Værn 
 Nils Hald as Jonas Værn 
 Didi Holtermann as Veronika 
 Magnus Hamlander as Reinert 
 Karen Rasmussen as Varvara, a Gypsy 
 Aksel Opsann as Mr. Wilson 
 P. A. Grindalen as the bailiff 
 Helga Rydland as Signekjerringa (the Sibyl)
 Ragnhild Hald as a young woman (not credited) 
 Tore Segelcke as a young girl (not credited)

References

External links

Farende folk at the National Library of Norway

1922 films
Norwegian silent feature films
Norwegian black-and-white films
Norwegian drama films
1922 drama films
Silent drama films